Pat Dunn or Patricia Dunn or Patrick Dunn may refer to:

Pat
 Pat Dunn (1858–1938), American mogul known as "The Duke of Padre Island" (see Nueces Hotel)
 Pat Dunn (basketball) (1931–1975), American professional basketball player
 Pat Dunn (politician) (born 1950), male Canadian politician
 Pat Dunn (referee) (1933–1999), British football referee.
Patricia
 Patricia Dunn (actress) (1930–1990), American actress
 Patricia C. Dunn (1953–2011), Hewlett-Packard chair involved in pretexting scandal
Patrick
 Patrick Dunn (Indian Army general) (1911–1977), Indian Army General Officer
 Patrick Dunn (RAF officer) (1912–2004), British officer
 Patrick Dunn (bishop) (born 1950), Roman Catholic Bishop of the Diocese of Auckland, New Zealand
 Patrick Dunn (ice hockey) (born 1963), French ice hockey player

See also
 Irina Dunn (born Patricia Irene Dunn 1948), Australian writer/politician
 Patrick Dun (1642–1713), Irish physician